The Molise regional election of 2018, for the renewal of the Regional Council of Molise and the election of the President of Molise, was held on 22 April 2018. Incumbent President Paolo Di Laura Frattura was not his party's candidate due to contrasts within the centre-left coalition. 

Donato Toma, a member of Forza Italia, gained the most votes and was elected president.

Parties and candidate

Results

Analysis
Unlike in the general election where the M5S reached about 44%, this time it reached 32%. In contrast, the centre-right coalition was up just under 20% compared to 4 March.

References

2018 elections in Italy
2018 regional election
April 2018 events in Italy
2018